The Police Act 1946 (1946 c.46) was an Act of Parliament of the Parliament of the United Kingdom that provided for the amalgamation of smaller borough police forces with county constabularies in England and Wales, allowed for the merger of county forces in certain circumstances and changed the boundaries of the Metropolitan Police District.

The appointed day for the amalgamations was 1 April 1947. On that date forty-five non-county borough police forces were merged with those of the counties in which they were situated. In the case of fourteen of these boroughs, they had already been temporarily placed under the county police by the Defence (Amalgamation of Police Forces) Regulations 1942. Section 13 of the 1946 Act made these amalgamations permanent. One non-county borough force, Cambridge City Police, was allowed to continue, the city having a larger population than the surrounding county. The Act made similar provision for Peterborough City Police, although in the event it formed a combined force with the Soke of Peterborough.

Following the 1947 mergers there were 133 police forces covering England and Wales:
Metropolitan Police
City of London Police
55 county police forces †
71 county borough police forces
1 non-county borough force (Cambridge)
4 combined police forces
† The actual number was 53, as the Lincolnshire Constabulary was jointly maintained by three counties.
 
Section 3 of the Act allowed for the voluntary amalgamation of county and county borough forces, while Section 4 gave the Home Secretary the power to make amalgamation schemes of constabularies.

Section 16 provided for the "rectification" of the Metropolitan Police District, realigning it with contemporary local government boundaries.

Section 18 placed the Isles of Scilly under the Cornwall County Constabulary

1947 amalgamations
Bedfordshire Constabulary absorbed Bedford Borough Police, Luton Borough Police
Berkshire Constabulary absorbed Windsor Borough Police
Buckinghamshire Constabulary absorbed Chepping Wycombe Borough Police
Carmarthenshire Constabulary absorbed Carmarthen Borough Police
Cheshire Constabulary absorbed Chester City Police, Congleton Borough Police, Hyde Borough Police, Macclesfield Borough Police, Stalybridge Borough Police
Cornwall and Isles of Scilly Constabulary formed by the merger of the Cornwall County Constabulary, Isles of Scilly Police and Penzance Borough Police
Cumberland and Westmorland Constabulary absorbed Kendal Borough Police
Derbyshire Constabulary absorbed Chesterfield Borough Police, Glossop Borough Police
Durham Constabulary absorbed Hartlepool Borough Police
Essex Constabulary absorbed Colchester Borough Police
Glamorgan Constabulary absorbed Neath Borough Police
Herefordshire Constabulary absorbed Hereford City Police
Hertfordshire Constabulary absorbed St Albans City Police
Kent Constabulary absorbed Canterbury City Police
Lancashire Constabulary absorbed Accrington Borough Police, Ashton-under-Lyne Borough Police, Bacup Borough Police, Clitheroe Borough Police, Lancaster City Police
Lincolnshire Constabulary absorbed Boston Borough Police, Grantham Borough Police
Norfolk Constabulary absorbed King's Lynn Borough Police
North Riding of Yorkshire Constabulary absorbed Scarborough Borough Police
Nottinghamshire Constabulary absorbed Newark Borough Police
Peterborough Combined Police formed from Peterborough City Police, Liberty of Peterborough Constabulary
Shropshire Constabulary absorbed Shrewsbury Borough Police
Staffordshire Constabulary absorbed Newcastle-under-Lyme Police
Warwickshire Constabulary absorbed Leamington Spa Borough Police
Worcestershire Constabulary absorbed Kidderminster Borough Police

Later amalgamations
The Home Secretary's powers under Section 4 of the Act were used on a number of occasions:
Hampshire Constabulary was formed in 1948 by a merger of Hampshire County Constabulary and Isle of Wight County Constabulary. This made permanent the 1943 merger of the two constabularies (as Hampshire Joint Police) under the 1942 Defence Regulations.
Mid Wales Constabulary was formed on 1 April 1948 from Breconshire Constabulary, Radnorshire Constabulary and Montgomeryshire Constabulary
Gwynedd Constabulary was formed in 1950 from Anglesey Constabulary, Caernarvonshire Constabulary and Merionethshire Constabulary
Leicestershire and Rutland Constabulary was formed on 1 April 1951 from Leicestershire Constabulary, Rutland Constabulary
Carmarthenshire and Cardiganshire Constabulary was formed on 1 July 1958 by the merger of Cardiganshire Constabulary and Carmarthenshire Constabulary. The amalgamation followed the unfavourable conclusions of an inquiry into the Cardiganshire force.

References

United Kingdom Acts of Parliament 1946
Acts of the Parliament of the United Kingdom concerning England and Wales
Law enforcement in England and Wales
Police legislation in the United Kingdom